The year 1978 in archaeology involved some significant events.

Excavations 
 New excavations at Brahmagiri by Amalananda Ghosh.
 Excavations begin at Bontnewydd Palaeolithic site in Wales.
 New excavations begin at Holyhead Mountain Hut Circles on Holy Island, Anglesey, off the coast of Wales.
 Comprehensive excavations at Alepotrypa cave in Greece begin.
 Excavation of Proto-Elamite levels of Susa in Iran.

Finds 
 February 21 - The remains of the Great Pyramid of Tenochtitlan.
 March - Pictish stone depicting a bearded figure at Rhynie, Aberdeenshire, Scotland.
 Bactrian Gold hoard.
 A new Shapwick hoard of Roman copper coins in England.
 Cherchen Man in China.
 A fossilized partial human cranium is among hominid remains found in Apidima Cave in southern Greece; in 2019 it is announced as dating to more than 210,000 years BP, making it the earliest example of Homo sapiens outside Africa.
 First discovery of European lion remains at Tiryns in Mycenaean Greece.
 Wreck of a Basque whaling galleon, probably the San Juan, off Saddle Island, Labrador.

Publications 
 Lewis R. Binford - Nunamiut Ethnoarchaeology.
 Mounir Bouchenaki - Cités antiques d'Algérie.
 Richard A. Gould (ed.) - Explorations in Ethnoarchaeology.
 Keith Muckelroy - Maritime Archaeology.
 Paleontologist Björn Kurtén's short novel Dance of the Tiger, dealing with the interaction between Cro-Magnons and Neanderthals, is published in Sweden as Den Svarta Tigern.

Events 
 Theban Mapping Project is established.
 September - Thousands march through Dublin to Wood Quay to protest against the building of civic offices on the Viking site.

Deaths 
 August 19 - Sir Max Mallowan, English archaeologist (born 1904).
 October 8 - Bertha Cody, Native American archaeologist (born 1907).
 November 8 - Terence Mitford, British archaeologist of the Near East (born 1905).

References 

Archaeology
Archaeology
Archaeology by year